Ilija Bozoljac and Somdev Devvarman were the defending champions, but decided not to compete.

Marin Draganja and Henri Kontinen won the title, defeating Rubén Ramírez Hidalgo and Franko Škugor in the final, 7–5, 5–7, [10–6].

Seeds

  Scott Lipsky /  Michael Venus (first round)
  Marin Draganja /  Henri Kontinen (champions)
  Ken Skupski /  Neal Skupski (semifinals)
  Gero Kretschmer /  Alexander Satschko (first round)

Draw

Main draw

References
 Main Draw
 Qualifying Draw

Sarasota Open - Doubles
2014 Doubles